A referendum on reopening for tourism was held in Easter Island on 24 October 2021. Despite the importance of tourism to the island's economy, the proposal was rejected by 66% of voters. Voter turnout was around 20%.

Background
The island was closed to visitors from 16 March 2020 due to the COVID-19 pandemic. Following the closure, there were only eight cases of COVID recorded (and no deaths), with the last case in September 2020.

In October 2021 Ma'u Henu (the organisation responsible for running the island's parks) organised a referendum amongst the indigenous population on whether the island should reopen to tourists in January 2022. Although the vote was consultative, the island authorities stated that they would respect the result.

Results

References

2021 in Chile
Easter Island
Referendums in Easter Island
October 2021 events in Chile
Election and referendum articles with incomplete results